Design-based learning (DBL), also known as design-based instruction, is an inquiry-based form of learning, or pedagogy, that is based on integration of design thinking and the design process into the classroom at the K-12 and post-secondary levels.  Design-based learning environments can be found across many disciplines, including those traditionally associated with design (e.g. art, architecture, engineering, interior design, graphic design), as well as others not normally considered to be design-related (science, technology, business, humanities).  DBL, as well as project-based learning and problem-based learning, is used to teach 21st century skills such as communication and collaboration and foster deeper learning.

Deeper learning is supported when students design and create an artifact that requires understanding and application of knowledge. DBL activity supports iteration as students create, assess, and redesign their projects. The work's complexity often requires collaboration and specialized roles, providing students with the opportunity to become "experts" in a particular area.  Design projects require students to establish goals and constraints, generate ideas, and create prototypes through storyboarding or other representational practices. Robotics competitions in schools are popular design-based learning activities, wherein student teams design, build and then pilot their robots in competitive challenges. 
 
Design-based learning was developed in the 1980s by Doreen Nelson, a professor at California State Polytechnic University, Pomona and the Art Center College of Design. Her findings suggested that kinesthetic problem-solving helps students acquire, retain, and synthesize information in practical ways.

Design process

The design process is an iterative process that has a variety of sequential steps: 
investigate context
identify needs
develop criteria
generate alternatives
select alternative
prototype/test
produce
evaluate

A similar approach is the ADDIE Model of instructional design, a framework of generic processes used by instructional designers and training developers. It represents a descriptive guideline with five distinct phases:
 Analysis
 Design
 Development
 Implementation
 Evaluation

Results
Positive benefits of the design-based learning approach have been observed, including student-based learning where students (often) identify their project's needs, develop their own ideas, and engage in a larger range of thinking than with the traditional scripted inquiry model. The results from the 2008 study by Mehalik et al. found significant improvement in student performance using the DBL model compared to the scripted model.  A 1998 study (Fraser, Fraser & Tobin, 1991) suggest that DBL has the potential to increase students' desire to learn, enhance success in science class, and increase  interest in science topics. Students were observed to be engaged in DBL and the lower-achieving students were able to explain concepts at higher levels than previously observed by their teacher. In-depth experience in design activities and creation of meaningful outcomes in technology were observed in terms of the finished product, documentation, and reflection.
 
Significant benefits of implementing DBL has been observed in the areas of math and science (Darling-Hammond et al., 2008).  Research has found that students who participate in learning by design projects have a more systematic understanding of a system's parts and functions that control groups (Hmelo, Holton, & Kolodner, 2000).

A 2000 study (Hmelo, Holton, and Kolodner) found that the design project led to better learning outcomes and included deeper learning than the traditional learning approach. The researchers also noted that the students developed greater understanding of complex systems.  The study found that in using DBL, both higher-achieving and lower-achieving students showed strong evidence of progress in learning the targeted concepts, students were able to apply key concepts in their work, and there were positive effects on motivation and sense of ownership over work product by both groups and individual students.

Implementation
The teaching of 21st century skills is more effective when teachers gain expertise in both the practice and the teaching of these skills, in effect becoming successful 21st century learners in the areas of:  communication and collaboration amongst teachers and with students; being flexible with new classroom dynamics; fostering independent student learning; adapting teaching and learning styles to new pedagogical approaches.

Challenges to implementing DBL include developing the skills of the instructors: 
 teachers' ability to select topics and activities that support, and benefit from, differing viewpoints and students' real-world experiences 
 selecting students who will work well together
 setting of effective ground rules to ensure equal opportunities to participate, 
 encouraging multiple strategies to foster full participation for all members of a group of team.

See also

Organizational learning

References

 Fraser, B. J., & Tobin, K.:  Combining qualitative and quantitative methods in classroom environment research. In B. J. Fraser & H. J. Walberg (Eds.), Educational environments: Evaluation, antecedents, and consequences (pp. 271–290). Oxford, UK: Pergamon Press. 1991.

External links
Design Based Learning
Design Based Learning for STEM
Education in the new millennium: the case for design-based learning, International Council of Societies of Industrial Design
About Design-Based Learning, Cal Poly Pomona

Applied learning
Inquiry
Pedagogy
Educational practices